Heterotheca grandiflora is a species of flowering plant in the family Asteraceae known by the common name silk-grass goldenaster or telegraphweed. It is native to the southwestern United States (California, Nevada, Utah, Arizona) and northwestern Mexico (Baja California), but it can be found in other areas as an introduced species, such as Hawaii. It is often a roadside weed even where it is native.

Heterotheca grandiflora is a tall, bristly, glandular plant exceeding a meter (40 inches) in height and densely foliated in hairy to spiny toothed or lobed leaves. Leaves are smaller and more widely spaced toward the top of the stem, which is occupied by an inflorescence of bright yellow daisy-like flower heads. The disc and ray florets drop away to leave a spherical head of achenes, each with a long white pappus.

References

External links
Jepson Manual Treatment
United States Department of Agriculture Plants Profile
Calphotos Photo gallery, University of California

grandiflora
Plants described in 1840
Flora of Baja California
Flora of the Southwestern United States